The 6th ACTRA Awards were presented on April 14, 1977.

Winners

References

ACTRA
ACTRA
ACTRA Awards